Vizbor may refer to:

 3260 Vizbor, an asteroid.
 Yuri Vizbor, a Soviet Bard.